Garyn Vernon Preen (born 25 October 1991) is a Welsh footballer who plays as a winger for RTB Ebbw Vale.

Club career
Preen began his career as a youth player with Welsh club Cardiff City, joining the youth system at Southampton at the age of 12. On 23 July 2010, with no appearances for the South Coast club, he joined League Two side Burton Albion on a free transfer following his release by the Saints. Preen made his debut for the club on 11 August in the First Round of the League Cup against former club Cardiff City, coming on as a 73rd-minute substitute for Lewis Young.

On 26 November he went on loan to Stafford Rangers with fellow Burton Albion player James Ellison. He made his debut for the club on 11 December in a 0-2 home defeat to Workington.

At the end of the 2010–11, Preen was released from the Brewers.

In June 2011 he joined Neath.

In 2012, he joined Salisbury City, before returning to Wales in October to sign for Merthyr Town. He joined Merthyr's Southern League rivals Cinderford Town in 2013.

Preen Signed for Hereford in 2017 and scored against Eastleigh in the FA Cup 4th Qualifying Round in that game he was taken off injured after a collision with Gavin Hoyte knocked him out. On 26 February 2018, he was released by Hereford F.C.

References

External links

Player profile

1991 births
Living people
Sportspeople from Tredegar
Welsh footballers
Association football midfielders
Cardiff City F.C. players
Southampton F.C. players
Burton Albion F.C. players
Stafford Rangers F.C. players
Neath F.C. players
Salisbury City F.C. players
Merthyr Town F.C. players
Afan Lido F.C. players
Hungerford Town F.C. players
Evesham United F.C. players
Hereford F.C. players
Cymru Premier players
RTB Ebbw Vale F.C. players